The 1968 Marshall Thundering Herd football team represented Marshall University in the 1968 NCAA University Division football season. The team was led by first-year coach Perry Moss, in his only season. They were outscored 129–358 by their opponents. The Thundering Herd finished the season 0–9–1 overall and 0–6 in MAC play to place last.

This marked Marshall's final season in the MAC as they were suspended indefinitely from the conference due to committing a number of recruiting violations. Marshall would rejoin the MAC in 1997.

Schedule

References

Marshall
Marshall Thundering Herd football seasons
College football winless seasons
Marshall Thundering Herd football